General Mariano Matamoros Airport , also known as Cuernavaca Airport, is an airport located in Temixco, Morelos, Mexico, near Cuernavaca. It handles only national air traffic for the city of Cuernavaca. It is part of the Mexico City Metropolitan Airport Group, along with the airports of Puebla, Querétaro, Pachuca, Mexico City, and Toluca. The airport is operated by the government-owned corporation Aeropuerto de Cuernavaca S.A. de C.V.

The airport, being composed of a sole terminal building (excluding general aviation terminal, hangars, and control tower), was recently renovated with the purpose of offering more modern facilities. It remains a national airport even though there were previous plans to convert it into an international point of entry.

It was Aerolíneas Internacionales' hub before the airline ceased operations in 2003. Previous operators used to be Aeroméxico, ALMA de México, Aerolíneas Internacionales (hub airline), Avolar, Mexicana de Aviacion and Volaris. VivaAerobus resumed service at the airport in July 2012, and ceased in September 2013.

It handled 3,627 passengers in 2021.

TAR resumed scheduled domestic service in March 2016.

On April 11, 2019, José Manuel Sanz Rivera, head of the office of the Governor of Morelos, said he is working to reactivate the airport. He has been in talks with Viva Aerobús to restart regular service and he is looking to extend the runway 600 meters so that it can serve as an alternative to the airports in Toluca and Mexico City.

Two pilots stole a private jet from Colombia (XA-PYZ) used for taxi service after filling it with fuel on September 22, 2020. Security personnel explained they thought they were student pilots.

See also 
 List of the busiest airports in Mexico
 List of airports in Mexico

References

External links 
 Cuernavaca Intl. Airport
 Cuernavaca Airport

Airports in Mexico
Cuernavaca